Lieutenant-Colonel Thomas Humphrey Brooke  (31 January 1914 – 24 December 1988) was a British civil servant and art historian. He was a Monuments Man  during the Second World War, then deputy director of London's Tate Gallery and secretary of the Royal Academy from 1952 to 1968. Serious depression in his 50s led to his early retirement, after which he became "an internationally acknowledged expert on roses".

Early life
Humphrey Brooke was born on 31 January 1914 into a family of Yorkshire wool millers. He was educated at Wellington College and Magdalen College, University of Oxford, where he graduated with a first in modern history.

Career
During the Second World War, Brooke worked in Italy with the Monuments, Fine Arts, and Archives program, rising to the rank of lieutenant colonel, and did further such work in 1946 in Austria.

He was deputy director of London's Tate Gallery, and then Secretary of the Royal Academy from 1952 to 1968. In 1960, he declared that a  painting believed to have been painted by Andrea del Verrocchio was actually painted by Leonardo da Vinci, making it the oldest known painting by Leonardo.

Serious manic depression led to his early retirement, after which he became "an internationally acknowledged expert on roses". He grew over 500 varieties of roses at his home, Lime Kiln in Suffolk, and in 1971 opened Lime Kiln to the public, calling it "the first rosarium in Great Britain". Brooke thought that his manic depression "could only be cured by sex and smoking". He studied many other historical figures who may have suffered from manic depression, and was particularly interested in Somerset County Cricket Club batsman Harold Gimblett. In 1982, Brooke wrote an article for The Observer about his illness, which received over 150 responses.

Personal life
Brooke married Nathalie Benckendorff, who he met in Austria after the war while working as a monuments man. Her mother was the harpist Maria Korchinska. Benckendorff's grandfather, Alexander Konstantinovich Benckendorff, was the Russian Empire's last ambassador to the UK.  Brooke was friends with fellow East Anglian rosarian Peter Beales.

Brooke died on 24 December 1988. A portrait of Brooke smoking by Olwyn Bowey hangs at the Royal Academy.

References

1914 births
1988 deaths
British art historians
British curators
Commanders of the Royal Victorian Order
Monuments men
Alumni of Magdalen College, Oxford
People educated at Wellington College, Berkshire
People with bipolar disorder
King's Royal Rifle Corps officers
British Army personnel of World War II